is a former Japanese football player.

Playing career
Takeshi Handa played for FC Machida Zelvia, MIO Biwako Shiga and Blaublitz Akita from 2009 to 2015.

References

External links

1985 births
Living people
Kokushikan University alumni
Association football people from Fukuoka Prefecture
Japanese footballers
J3 League players
Japan Football League players
FC Machida Zelvia players
MIO Biwako Shiga players
Blaublitz Akita players
Association football midfielders